Sorbaria tomentosa, the Himalayan sorbaria or Kashmir false spirea, is a species of flowering plant in the family Rosaceae. A shrub with white flowers that can grow up to 6 metres in height. It is native to Afghanistan, Central Asia and the Himalayas, and has been introduced to the South Island of New Zealand. It has gone extinct in Tajikistan. Its putative variety Sorbaria tomentosa var. angustifolia, the narrow-leaved Himalayan sorbaria, has gained the Royal Horticultural Society's Award of Garden Merit.

References

tomentosa
Flora of Afghanistan
Flora of Kyrgyzstan
Flora of Nepal
Flora of Pakistan
Flora of Uzbekistan
Flora of West Himalaya
Plants described in 1938